Dischizocera is a genus of flies in the family Stratiomyidae.

Species
Dischizocera brunneinervis James, 1957
Dischizocera huzuana Lindner, 1965
Dischizocera nigronotum James, 1957
Dischizocera vasta Lindner, 1952
Dischizocera zumpti Lindner, 1952

References

Stratiomyidae
Brachycera genera
Diptera of Africa